The HTC Touch2 (also known as the HTC T3333 and HTC Mega), is a mobile telephone running the Windows Mobile operating system. The phone was designed and manufactured by HTC, and was released in Europe in November 2009. It is a middle budget smart phone featuring Windows Mobile 6.5 and Touch Flo 2D.

Specifications
Screen size: 
Screen resolution: 240 x 320, QVGA, backlit TFT LCD
Input devices: Resistive touchscreen, front panel buttons
Battery: 1100 mAh
Talk time: 440 minutes (GSM) to 370 minutes (WCDMA)
Standby time: 370 hours (GSM) to 500 hours (WCDMA)
3.2-megapixel rear-facing camera
GPS and A-GPS
520 MHz Qualcomm MSM7225 processor
RAM: 256 MB
ROM: 512 MB
TouchFLO 2D
Browser: Opera Mobile and Internet Explorer
3G: Up to 7.2 Mbit/s download speed, up to 384 kbit/s upload speed
microSD slot (SDHC compatible) up to 32 GB
Operating system: Windows Mobile 6.5 Professional
Quad band GSM/GPRS/EDGE (GSM 850, GSM 900, GSM 1800, GSM 1900)
Wi-Fi (802.11b/g) (Including WiFi router)
Bluetooth 2.1 + EDR & A2DP
Mini USB
3.5 mm audio jack, microphone, speaker
FM radio
Size:  (h)  (w)  (d)
Weight:  with battery

External links
HTC Touch2 product page (Europe)

Touch2